The Headies Award for Artiste of the Year is an award presented at The Headies, a ceremony that was established in 2006 and originally called the Hip Hop World Awards. It was first presented to P-Square in 2006.

Recipients

Category records
Most wins

Most nominations

Notes

References

The Headies